Siddal may refer to:

Siddal (band), an ethereal goth band, named after Elizabeth Siddal
Siddal, West Yorkshire, a location in Halifax, West Yorkshire, England
Siddal A.R.L.F.C., a rugby league
Elizabeth Siddal, (1829–1862), Pre-Raphaelite model, poet, and artist